Girolamo Giacobbi (baptized on 10 August 1567 – before 13 February 1629) was an Italian choirmaster, conductor, and composer.

Life
Giocobbi was born in Bologna in 1567. He had been a choir boy at the Basilica of San Petronio in Bologna and became the Director of Music there from 1604 to 1628. He founded the "Accademia dei Filomusi" dedicated to the cultivation of music in Bologna.

He wrote a significant number of sacred works and was especially active in the field of opera. Giacobbi was a composer of high esteem during his time.

Operas
L'Aurora ingannata - libretto by Ridolfo Campeggi, performed in Bologna in 1605.
L'Andromeda - a tragic opera in five acts with a libretto by Campeggi, performed in Bologna in the carnival of 1610.
Proserpina rapita - libretto by Campeggi performed in Bologna in 1613.
Amor prigioniero - libretto by Silvestro Branchi, performed in Bologna in 1615.
Il Tancredi - libretto by Campeggi, performed in Bologna in 1615.
Il Reno sacrificante - libretto by Campeggi, performed in Bologna in 1617.
Ruggiero liberato - performed in Bologna in 1620.
La selva dei mirti - libretto by Bernardino Marescotti, performed in Bologna in 1623.
La montagna fulminata - libretto by Marescotti, performed in Bologna in 1628 and probably his last work.

Notes

External links
Bühnenwerk Giacobbis

1567 births
1620s deaths
17th-century Italian composers
Italian Baroque composers
Italian male classical composers
Italian opera composers
Male opera composers
17th-century male musicians